British India are an Australian rock band from Melbourne. The band is made up of lead vocalist and guitarist Declan Melia, guitarist Nic Wilson, bassist Will Drummond and drummer Matt O'Gorman. In 2019, Jack Tosi replaced Nic Wilson as a touring member of the band. They have released six studio albums.

History 
Formation and Early Shows 2003 - 2006

The members of British India met in 2003 in high school at St. Bede's College, in Melbourne, Victoria. The band began rehearsing and writing songs in the pool room at drummer Matt O'Gorman's parent's house. Early influences included The Strokes, The White Stripes, The Datsuns, and Interpol. Upon finishing high school, the band began gigging extensively at pub and club shows throughout Melbourne. 

In 2005 the band recorded a vinyl seven inch single called "Outside 109" with producer Lindsay Gravina at his Birdland studios. The single was given airplay on Triple J, and generated some interest in the Australian music industry.

Counter Culture EP and Guillotine 2006 - 2007

In 2005 the band met producer and future manager Glenn Goldsmith who provided early demos to Australian producer Harry Vanda, Vanda agreed to finance and produce the band.                                                                                

​In late 2005 the band recorded the four track Counter Culture EP at Vanda's Flashpoint Studios in Sydney with Vanda and Goldsmith as producers. Promoted with the single "The Time" the EP made little impact, producing no label interest or radio airplay.   

In 2006 the band returned to Flashpoint to record their debut album Guillotine, again produced by Vanda and Goldsmith. After being shelved for several months due to lack of label interest, the album was eventually released independently through Flashpoint Music and Shock Records distribution. 

Guillotine was released in July 2007 and included the singles "Black & White Radio", "Tie Up My Hands", "Run The Red Light" and "Russian Roulette". This was followed by a successful Australian tour and festival appearances at Homebake festival and The Big Day Out.  Triple J played the album extensively and "Tie Up My Hands" and "Run The Red Light" charted in the Triple J Hottest 100 of that year. Guillotine was nominated for the J Award in 2007, and won the Australian Independent Record (AIR) Award for Best New Artist.

Thieves 2008

Throughout 2007, British India continued to play shows and festivals while writing material for their second album. In April 2008 they began recording their second album Thieves, again with Harry Vanda and Glenn Goldsmith at Flashpoint Studios Sydney. Thieves entered the ARIA Album Chart at #5. The first single, "I Said I'm Sorry" reached number 23 in Triple J's Hottest 100 for 2008. Thieves was nominated for Best Independent Album in the 2008 ARIA awards. 

Avalanche 2010

In 2009 British India parted with Flashpoint Music and recorded their third album Avalanche independently throughout 2009. The album was recorded at Sing Sing studios Melbourne and produced by Glenn Goldsmith. Avalanche was released in March 2010 and promoted by the single "Vanilla". The album debuted in the top 10 and sold 20,000 copies. The album was followed by extensive touring and festival appearances. 

In late 2010, Shock Records fell into receivership following the album release, and was unable to pay the band unpaid royalties. Later that year, British India embarked on their first UK tour pursuing interest from Warner Music UK. The tour was successful, but an album deal with Warner did not eventuate. 

The band returned from the UK to find their rehearsal space had flooded. At the end of 2010  the band were suffering from writers block and financial hardship following Shock's receivership and the expensive UK tour.

Controller 2013

In late 2010 British India released a stand-alone single "March into The Ocean" and embarked on the biggest Australian tour of their careers in early 2011.  

Following the tour, they built a new rehearsal space and recording studio: Josif K studios in Preston, Melbourne. Now able to demo songs for the first time in their careers, they generated interest with Australian label Liberation Music who agreed to release their fourth album. 

The band’s fourth album, Controller was recorded at Sing Sing Studios and produced by Glenn Goldsmith. The first single "I Can Make You Love Me" would later be certified Gold for selling 20,000 units and came in at number 37 in Triple J's Hottest 100 of 2012. This was followed by the singles "Summer Forgive Me", and "Plastic Souvenirs". 

The album was followed by extensive Australian touring including supporting The Rolling Stones on their 14 On Fire Tour.

Nothing Touches Me 2015

The band released their fifth album Nothing Touches Me in March 2015. Although the band attempted to record the album in Berlin in late 2014, the results were considered lacklustre, and the band returned to Sing Sing studios where the album was again produced by Glenn Goldsmith. Nothing Touches Me debuted at Number five on the Australian album charts and included the singles "Suddenly" and "Wrong Direction".

The band toured in support of the album and played the biggest venues of their career. The tour was a success with all shows selling out. The success of Nothing Touches Me was encapsulated when British India headlined the main stage at the 2015 Byron Bay Bluesfest as a replacement for The Black Keys.

Forgetting The Future 2017

In 2017 the band left Josif K studios and relocated to Sing Sing South recording studio in Melbourne to begin working on songs for their sixth album. Wanting to record with a new producer, they teamed up with Oscar Dawson of Holy Holy. Their sixth album Forgetting the Future was released in October 2017 and was promoted with the singles "Precious" and "My Love".

Following the tour promoting Forgetting the Future founding member Nic Wilson announced that he would no longer tour with the band. In 2019 the remaining members recruited Jack Tosi of Stealing O'Neil to replace Nic on guitar and the band embarked on a successful Australian tour in August 2019.

Discography

Studio albums

EPs

Singles

Compilation appearances
 Discoveries (2007) – "Black & White Radio"
 Triple J Hottest 100 Vol.15 (2007) - "Tie Up My Hands"
 Triple J's Like a Version 4 (2008) - "And I Was a Boy from School"

Awards

AIR Awards
The Australian Independent Record Awards (commonly known informally as AIR Awards) is an annual awards night to recognise, promote and celebrate the success of Australia's Independent Music sector.

|-
| 2007
|themselves
| Most Outstanding New Independent Artist
| 
|-
| 2008
| Thieves
| Best Independent Album
| 
|-
| 2010
|themselves
| Best Independent Artist
| 
|-
| 2015
| Nothing Touches Me 
| Best Independent Hard Rock or Punk Album
| 
|-

ARIA Music Awards
The ARIA Music Awards is an annual awards ceremony that recognises excellence, innovation, and achievement across all genres of Australian music. 

|-
| rowspan="2"| 2008
| Thieves
| Best Independent Release
| 
|-
| Harry Vanda and Glen Goldsmith for Thieves
| Producer of the Year
| 
|-

J Award
The J Awards are an annual series of Australian music awards that were established by the Australian Broadcasting Corporation's youth-focused radio station Triple J. They commenced in 2005.

|-
| J Awards of 2007
|Guillotine
| Australian Album of the Year
|

References

External links

 
 British India on MySpace
 British India on Web Wombat

2004 establishments in Australia
Australian indie rock groups
Musical groups established in 2004
Musical groups from Melbourne